The thirteenth season of the American animated television series Bob's Burgers premiered on Fox on September 25, 2022. It is the first season to air after the movie.

Production
On September 23, 2020, Bob's Burgers was renewed for a twelfth and thirteenth production cycle by Fox. Beginning with this season, the opening sequence now features a sinkhole and a "grand re-re-re-re-opening" banner, referencing the events of The Bob's Burgers Movie. Despite being the thirteenth broadcast season, the season is composed mostly of episodes from the twelfth cycle which are denoted with the production code CASAxx.

Episodes

References

2022 American television seasons
2023 American television seasons
 Bob's Burgers seasons